Benno Schmitz (born 17 November 1994) is a German professional footballer who plays as a right-back for Bundesliga side 1. FC Köln.

Career
Schmitz started playing football at local Munich club SV Waldperlach. In 2001, he joined the youth ranks of  Bayern Munich where he eventually was promoted to their reserve team in 2012. Having failed to establish himself at the first team, he left the club and signed for Austrian champion Red Bull Salzburg in the summer of 2014.

On 23 August 2014, he made his league debut in a 5-0 home win against Rheindorf Altach by coming on as a substitute for Christian Schwegler after 83 minutes. In 2018, after a quiet stint with Leipzig, Schmitz was transferred to newly relegated side 1. FC Köln for a fee of €1.5 million. In March 2022, having established himself in the club's starting line-up during the 2021–22 season, Schmitz extended his contract at Köln until June 2024.

Career statistics

Honours
Austrian Bundesliga: 2014–15

References

External links
Eurosport profile

1994 births
Living people
German footballers
Footballers from Munich
Association football fullbacks
Germany youth international footballers
Bundesliga players
2. Bundesliga players
Regionalliga players
Austrian Football Bundesliga players
2. Liga (Austria) players]
FC Bayern Munich II players
FC Red Bull Salzburg players
FC Liefering players
RB Leipzig players
1. FC Köln players
German expatriate footballers
German expatriate sportspeople in Austria
Expatriate footballers in Austria